A bifid nose (also known as cleft nose) is an uncommon congenital malformation which is characterized by the presence of a cleft between the two nostrils of the nose. It is the result of a disturbance during embryological nose development.

It is part of the Tessier classification for craniofacial clefts.

Signs and symptoms 

The visibility of this malformation varies from person to person; from a barely noticeable "line" in the middle of the nose to the complete clefting of the nose which results in two "half noses", the airway is usually adequate. Individuals with this birth anomaly don't have any symptoms related to their bifid nose.

Complications 

This condition is merely cosmetic, and the severity of it doesn't affect a person with the disorder (health-wise) since usually there is a normal and adequate nasal airway.

Diagnosis 

This condition can be diagnosed by physical examination.

This difference can serve as a diagnostic method since it occurs alongside other malformations, such as frontonasal dysplasia, hypertelorbitism and cleft lips.

Bifid noses can also be diagnosed prenatally via a coronal view of the face under ultrasonography, they typically have a broad appearance with "a cleavage between the nostrils resembling a double barrel gun".

Causes 

This condition is caused due to incomplete fusion of both sides of the nose during embryonic life.

This anomaly is highly hereditary: autosomal dominant and autosomal recessive inheritance patterns have been observed in multiple families.

If the bifid nose is accompanied by abnormalities of the anorectal and renal systems, it may be part of a different separate genetic disorder (which is characterized by overlapping toes, renal adysplasia and variable anorectal anomalies) that is caused by autosomal recessive mutations in the FREM1 gene.

Treatment 

Generally, sutures and rhinoplasty can be done in order to get rid of a bifid nose tip (though what surgery should be done depends on the severity of the cleft nose). Open W-shaped surgical incisions have also proven to be effective. Surgery is usually done before the age of 5.

Prevalence 

This birth anomaly affects less than 0.0008% of people worldwide, making it the most common midline craniofacial cleft.

8% of people with bifid nose also have hypertelorism.

Bifid nose as a hereditary trait 

Two forms of inheritance pattern for bifid noses have been described: autosomal recessive and autosomal dominant.

One case per inheritance pattern follows:

Autosomal dominant: Anyane-Yeboa et al. (1984) describes 5 women from a 3-generation American family. Karyotypes and skull X-rays done on the younger sisters gave normal results.
Autosomal recessive: Boo-Chai et al. (1965) describes 3 siblings from a continental Indian family.

History 

This condition was first described in medical literature in 1939 by Esser et al. when they described 5 children (4 siblings and a male first-cousin of theirs) from a single family.

Occurrence in animals 

This condition can also occur in animals, such as dogs.

See also 

Cleft palate
Cleft lip
Cleft chin

References 

Genetic diseases and disorders